Laraesima brunneoscutellaris is a species of beetle in the family Cerambycidae. It was described by Tippmann in 1960. It is known from Brazil.

References

Compsosomatini
Beetles described in 1960